Timothy Galjé (born 5 June 2001) is a Belgian professional footballer who plays as a goalkeeper for Belgian First Division A club Seraing.

Club career 
On 17 October 2020, Galjé signed for Seraing. On 22 May 2021, he extended his contract with the club, signing a one-year contract with an option for a further year. Galjé made his debut for Seraing in a 3–0 Belgian Cup win over Lokeren-Temse on 15 September 2021. His league debut came in a 4–0 Belgian First Division A loss to Union Saint-Gilloise on 18 January 2022.

Personal life 
Timothy's uncle Hans is a former footballer.

References 

2001 births
Living people
Belgian footballers
Association football goalkeepers
Beerschot A.C. players
Lierse S.K. players
Club Brugge KV players
Standard Liège players
R.F.C. Seraing (1922) players
Belgian Pro League players
Belgium youth international footballers